107 (one hundred [and] seven) is the natural number following 106 and preceding 108.

In mathematics
107 is the 28th prime number. The next prime is 109, with which it comprises a twin prime, making 107 a Chen prime.

Plugged into the expression , 107 yields 162259276829213363391578010288127, a Mersenne prime. 107 is itself a safe prime.

It is the fourth Busy beaver number, the maximum number of steps that any Turing machine with 2 symbols and 4 states can make before eventually halting.

It is the number of triangle-free graphs on 7 vertices.

It is the ninth emirp, because reversing its digits gives another prime number (701)

In other fields
As "one hundred and seven", it is the smallest positive integer requiring six syllables in English (without the "and" it only has five syllables and seventy-seven is a smaller 5-syllable number).

107 is also:
 The atomic number of bohrium.
 The emergency telephone number in Argentina and Cape Town.
 The telephone of the police in Hungary.
 A common designation for the fair use exception in copyright law (from 17 U.S.C. 107)
 Peugeot 107 model of car

In sports
 The 107% rule, a Formula One Sporting Regulation in operation from 1996 to 2002 and 2011 onward.
 The number 107 is also associated with the Timbers Army supporters group of the Portland Timbers soccer team, in reference to the stadium seating section where the group originally congregated.

See also
 List of highways numbered 107

References 

Integers